Kennedy Cottage is a historic cure cottage located at Saranac Lake, town of North Elba in Essex County, New York.  It was built about 1897 and is a large, -story wood-frame rectangular structure in the Queen Anne style.  It features a 3-story tower set at a 45-degree angle at the northwest corner of the house, glass-enclosed verandah, and three visible attached cure porches.  It was operated as a private sanatorium and the National Vaudeville Philanthropic Association sent patients here before the opening of Will Rogers Memorial Hospital in 1928.

It was listed on the National Register of Historic Places in 1992.  It is located in the Helen Hill Historic District.

References

Houses on the National Register of Historic Places in New York (state)
Queen Anne architecture in New York (state)
Houses completed in 1897
Houses in Essex County, New York
National Register of Historic Places in Essex County, New York
Individually listed contributing properties to historic districts on the National Register in New York (state)